Acizzia dodonaeae is a psyllid common on Dodonaea viscosa.

Distribution 
A. dodonaeae is endemic to the Australian Alps, Tasmania, and New Zealand.

Description 
The adult, with wings folded, is from 2.25 to 2.75 millimetres long. Head and thorax are white to pale buff coloured, and the abdomen is green.

Gallery

References 

Psyllidae
Insects described in 1952
Hemiptera of Australia